The 1999–2000 Atlanta Thrashers season was the inaugural campaign for the franchise that would play in Atlanta for 11 seasons.

The Thrashers finished their inaugural season with an NHL-worst record of 14–57–7–4 for 39 points. To date, it is the worst season in the history of the Atlanta Thrashers/Winnipeg Jets franchise. In addition, it represents the lowest full-season point total since the beginning of the NHL's "three-point" standings system in 1999–2000, as well as the lowest point total for any team playing an 82-game season. The rebuilding Detroit Red Wings tied the mark 19 seasons later. But, because of the COVID-19 pandemic, the Red Wings played 71 games, 11 less than the Thrashers. Their .238 points percentage was the lowest by an NHL team since the 1993–94 Ottawa Senators.

Offseason

Expansion draft

These results are numbered 1–26 for aesthetic purposes, but the players were not necessarily chosen in this order.  As the Thrashers were the only team participating in the draft, the order is inconsequential.

Regular season
The newly formed Thrashers selected Patrik Stefan with the first overall selection in the 1999 NHL Entry Draft.

The players who were introduced to the NHL as members of the expansion Thrashers, along with Stefan were Bryan Adams, Scott Fankhouser, Andreas Karlsson, Geordie Kinnear, Per Svartvadet, and Sergei Vyshedkevich. Éric Bertrand and Frantisek Kaberle played their rookie campaigns as members of the Thrashers, too, but they weren't Thrashers to begin with, with Bertrand getting traded from the New Jersey Devils, the eventual Stanley Cup champions, and Kaberle getting traded from the Los Angeles Kings. 

They played their first game on October 2, 1999, losing 4–1 to the eventual Stanley Cup Champions, the New Jersey Devils. Captain Kelly Buchberger scored the franchise's first goal in the loss. The Thrashers would not get their first win until two weeks later. Damian Rhodes blanked the New York Islanders 2–0 on the road. The Thrashers would not get their first victory in Atlanta until October 26 when they beat the Calgary Flames in their return to Atlanta 2–1. Andrew Brunette led the team in scoring with 50 points as the Thrashers finished last in the Southeast Division with a NHL worst record of 14–57–7–4.

In addition to being shut out a league-high 12 times, the Thrashers struggled offensively and defensively, scoring the fewest goals (170) and allowing the most goals (313) out of all 28 teams. They also tied the Chicago Blackhawks for most short-handed goals allowed, with 13.

Final standings

Schedule and results

Player statistics

Regular season
Scoring

Goaltending

Awards and records

Records

Milestones

Transactions
The Thrashers were involved in the following transactions during the 1999–2000 season.

Trades

Free agents signed

Free Agents Lost

Waivers Claims

Lost on Waivers

Draft picks
Atlanta's picks at the 1999 NHL Entry Draft.

See also
1999–2000 NHL season

References
 Thrashers Official Web Site for 1999–2000 Stats
 Thrashers on Database Hockey

Atlanta Thrashers seasons
Atlanta Thrashers season, 1999-2000
Atlanta Thrashers season, 1999-2000
Atlanta Thrashers
Atlanta Thrashers